New Zealand at the 1978 Commonwealth Games was represented by a team of 102 competitors and 32 officials. Selection of the team for the Games in Edmonton, Canada, was the responsibility of the New Zealand Olympic and Commonwealth Games Association. New Zealand's flagbearer at the opening ceremony was cyclist Neil Lyster. The New Zealand team finished fifth on the medal table, winning a total of 20 medals, five of which were gold.

New Zealand has competed in every games, starting with the British Empire Games in 1930 at Hamilton, Ontario.

Nigeria boycotted the 1978 Games in protest at New Zealand's sporting contacts with apartheid-era South Africa.

Medal tables
New Zealand was fifth on the medal table in 1978, with a total of 20 medals, including five gold.

Competitors
The following table lists the number of New Zealand competitors participating at the Games according to gender and sport.

Athletics

Track and road

Field

Combined
Men's decathlon

Women's pentathlon

Badminton

Singles

Doubles

Teams

Boxing

Cycling

Road
Men's road race

Track
Men's 1000 m sprint

Men's tandem 2000 m sprint

Men's 1 km time trial

Men's 4000 m pursuit

Men's 10 miles scratch race

Diving

Gymnastics

Men

Women

Lawn bowls

Shooting

Pistol

Rifle

Shotgun

Swimming

Weightlifting

Wrestling

Officials
 Team manager – Jack Prestney
 Assistant team manager – Tay Wilson
 Women's manager – Marion Jackman
 Team doctor – Noel Roydhouse
 Physiotherapists – Peter Stokes, Mark Oram
 Attache – G. R. Thompson
 Athletics
 Section manager – Barry Hunt
 Coach (track) – Arch Jelley
 Coach (field) – Les Mills
 Badminton section manager – Paul Skelt
 Bowls section manager – Gordon Jolly
 Boxing
 Section manager – C. F. Scott
 Trainer – Alan Scaife
 Cycling
 Section manager – Gordon Sharrock
 Coach (track) – Max Vertongen
 Coach (road) – Wayne Thorpe
 Mechanic – G. J. Brady
 Gymnastics
 Section manager – P. Chan
 Coach (men) – M. C. Charteris
 Coach (women) – A. J. Holt
 Shooting
 Section manager – A. A. Brown
 Assistant section manager (full-bore) – Ben Hoban
 Coach (rapid-fire pistol) – D. H. Stringer
 Coach (free pistol) – J. A. Gordon
 Swimming and diving
 Section manager – I. N. Chadwick
 Chief coach – R. J. McIntyre
 Coach (diving) – M. H. Campbell
 Weightlifting section manager – Bruce Cameron
 Wrestling
 Section manager – K. J. Humphrey
 Coach – C. L. Palmer

See also
New Zealand Olympic Committee 
New Zealand at the Commonwealth Games
New Zealand at the 1976 Summer Olympics
New Zealand at the 1980 Summer Olympics

References

External links
NZOC website on the 1978 games 
Commonwealth Games Federation website

1978
Nations at the 1978 Commonwealth Games
Commonwealth Games